Arnab Nandi (born 11 September 1987) is an Indian cricketer who plays for Bengal.

References

External links
 

1987 births
Living people
Indian cricketers
Railways cricketers
Bengal cricketers
East Zone cricketers